This is a list of notable female bass guitarists.

A 

 Adele played bass in tracks "Best for Last" and "Make You Feel My Love" on her album 19
 Gaye Advert (from The Adverts)
 Mai Agan
 Kianna Alarid (from Tilly and the Wall)
 Chloe Alper (from Pure Reason Revolution)
 Jennifer Arroyo (formerly of Kittie)
 Stephanie Ashworth (from Something for Kate)
 Talena Atfield (formerly of Kittie)
 Melissa Auf der Maur (formerly of Hole and The Smashing Pumpkins)
 Carla Azar (from autolux)

B 

 Laura Ballance (from Superchunk)
 Jeneda Benally (from Blackfire)
 Jo Bench (from Bolt Thrower)
 Christina Billotte (formerly of Autoclave)
 Gina Birch (from The Raincoats)
 Lori Black (from Melvins)
 Vicki Blue (formerly of The Runaways)
 Joanna Bolme (from Stephen Malkmus and the Jicks)
 Butterfly Boucher
 Fallon Bowman (formerly of Kittie)
 Shanne Bradley (founding member of The Nips and The Men They Couldn't Hang)
 Beverly Breckenridge (from Fifth Column and Phono-Comb)
 Rosemary Butler (formerly of Birtha)

C 

 Yolanda Charles
 Tish Ciravolo (sASSafrASS, Rag Dolls, The Velvets, They Eat Their Own, Shiksa and the Sluts, Lypstik). Founder of Daisy Rock Girl Guitars, who supply guitars made for females
 Sheryl Crow played bass on her second album, Sheryl Crow, and frequently plays bass during her live performances

D 

 Kimberley Dahme (from Boston)
 Victoria De Angelis (bassist of Italian rock band Måneskin, winner of Sanremo 2021 and Eurovision 2021)
 Kim Deal (formerly of Pixies, also lead singer/guitarist of The Breeders)
 Camille Debray of The SoapGirls
 Blu DeTiger
 Mohini Dey
 Jane Dodd (formerly of The Chills, Verlaines and Able Tasmans)
 Gail Ann Dorsey (session bassist for David Bowie and many other musicians, and toured with Lenny Kravitz)
 Donna Dresch (bassist and guitarist from Team Dresch)
 Stefanie Drootin (bass for The Good Life, also lead singer/guitarist for Consafos)

E 

 Islam Elbeiti

F 

 Alla Fedynitch
 Jennifer Finch (from L7)
 Nicole Fiorentino (from The Smashing Pumpkins, Veruca Salt, Spinnerette)
 Theresa Flaminio
 Maya Ford a.k.a. "Donna F" (from The Donnas)
 Kathy Foster (from The Thermals)
 Jackie Fox (from The Runaways)
 Misia Furtak (from Très.b)
 Miki Furukawa (from Supercar)

G 

 Manou Gallo (Côte d'Ivoire, formerly of Zap Mama)
Eva Gardner (formerly of The Mars Volta, now with Lyra and toured with Pink)
 Inara George (from The Bird and the Bee)
 Debbie Googe (from My Bloody Valentine)
 Kim Gordon (from Sonic Youth)
 Ellie Goulding
 Gail Greenwood (from Belly and formerly of L7)
 Camila Grey (Uh Huh Her)

H 

 Rachel Haden (from The Rentals; formerly of That Dog)
 Bianca "Butthole" Halstead (from Betty Blowtorch; formerly of Butt Trumpet)
 Leslie Hardy (formerly of Hole)
 Juliana Hatfield (formerly of Blake Babies, played bass on The Lemonheads' It's a Shame about Ray; currently singer/guitarist)
 Maureen Herman (from Babes in Toyland)
 Annie Holland (formerly of Elastica)

I 

 Joyce Irby (from Klymaxx)

J 

 Joan Jett (from Joan Jett & the Blackhearts; normally plays rhythm guitar, but played bass for The Runaways in 1977)

K 

 Carol Kaye (One of the most recorded bass players in history)
 Charlotte Kemp Muhl (from The Ghost of a Saber Tooth Tiger)
 Kerri Kenney-Silver (formerly of Cake Like)
 Debra Killings
 Holly Knight (formerly of Device) handled the bass parts on the band's lone album 22B3

L 

 Laura Lee (from Khruangbin)
 Sara Lee (from Gang of Four, The B-52's, Robert Fripp's League of Gentlemen) and Indigo Girls
 Paz Lenchantin (from Pixies, formerly of The Entrance Band, A Perfect Circle and Zwan. She has also contributed to songs for Queens of the Stone Age )
 Jenny Lewis (from Rilo Kiley)
 Jenny Lee Lindberg (from Warpaint)

M 

 Michelle Mae (from Weird War and formerly of The Make-Up)
 Leslie Mah (from Tribe 8 and formerly of Anti-Scrunti Faction)
 Natalie Maines (from the Dixie Chicks) periodically plays bass during their live shows
 Aimee Mann (founding member of 'Til Tuesday)
 Zia McCabe (from The Dandy Warhols)
 Molly McGuire
 Mitski
 Patricia Morrison (The Sisters of Mercy, The Gun Club, The Damned)
 Robin Moulder (from TCR and Jack Off Jill)

N 

 Michie Nakatani (formerly of Shonen Knife)
 Johnette Napolitano (from Concrete Blonde)
 Kate Nash
 Meshell Ndegeocello (Grammy-winning bassist and singer)
 Danielle Nicole (Trampled Under Foot)
 Ida Nielsen (of Zap Mama, Michael Learns to Rock, 3rdeyegirl and The New Power Generation)
 Kim Nielsen (from Phantom Blue)

O 

 Tomomi Ogawa (from Scandal)
 Cait O'Riordan (The Pogues)
 Wanda Ortiz (from The Iron Maidens)
 Yuko Oshima (from AKB48)
 Catherine Owen

P 

 Kristen Pfaff (formerly of Hole and Janitor Joe)
 Britta Phillips (from Luna and Dean and Britta)
 Tessa Pollitt (from The Slits)
 Ginger Pooley (formerly of The Smashing Pumpkins, Halo Friendlies)
 Catherine Popper (formerly of Ryan Adams & the Cardinals and Grace Potter and the Nocturnals)

Q 

 Suzi Quatro (leads an unnamed backing band. Formerly of Cradle, The Pleasure Seekers, and The Art Quatro Trio)

R 

 Leah Randi
 Julianne Regan (formerly of Gene Loves Jezebel)
 Regina Zernay Roberts (from Scarlet Fever, formerly of Cowboy Mouth and Méchant)
 Kira Roessler (from Dos and formerly of Black Flag)
 Share Ross (from Vixen, formerly of Contraband, Havana 3 A.M. and the Dogs D'Amour)
 Divinity Roxx (toured with Beyoncé, Victor Wooten, 2NE1)

S 

 Jeanne Sagan (from The Acacia Strain, All That Remains)
 Anna Sentina
 Kim Shattuck (formerly of The Pandoras, filled in as touring bassist for Pixies, now singer/guitarist for The Muffs)
 Shingai Shoniwa (from Noisettes)
 Melanie Sisneros (from Crescent Shield, Whole Lotta Rosies, Hangar 18, Mz Led formerly of The Iron Maidens, Sinergy, New Eden)
 Grace Slick (formerly of Jefferson Starship, Starship, Jefferson Airplane, The Great Society); primarily a singer, but sometimes played bass for The Great Society
 Debbie Smith (from Echobelly)
 Esperanza Spalding
 Donita Sparks (from Donita Sparks and the Stellar Moments and L7)
 Malka Spigel (from Githead and Minimal Compact)
 Micki Steele (from The Bangles, formerly of The Runaways)
 Eliot Sumner
 Sunmi (primarily a singer but previously played for the Wonder Girls)

T 

 Ritsuko Taneda (from Shonen Knife)
 Rachel Trachtenburg (from Trachtenburg Family Slideshow Players)
 Abby Travis
 Iracema Trevisan (from Cansei de Ser Sexy)
 Shonna Tucker (Previously of Drive-by Tuckers)

V 

 Kathy Valentine (from The Go-Go's, also lead singer/guitarist for The BlueBonnets and the Delphines)
 Ivana "Ivy" Vujic (formerly with Kittie)

W 

 Kim Warnick (co-founder of Fastbacks; formerly of Visqueen)
 Tina Weymouth (founding member of Talking Heads and Tom Tom Club)
 Josephine Wiggs (from The Breeders)
 Kathi Wilcox (from Bikini Kill)
 Tal Wilkenfeld (formerly toured with Jeff Beck, solo)
 Anka Wolbert (formerly of Clan of Xymox a/k/a Xymox)
 Tracy Wormworth (The Waitresses, The B-52's, Sting)
 D'arcy Wretzky (formerly of The Smashing Pumpkins)

Y 

 Atsuko Yamano (from Shonen Knife)
 Naomi Yang (from Galaxie 500, Magic Hour, and Damon & Naomi)
 Toko Yasuda (from Enon)
 Jennifer York (formerly of Rachel Rachel)
 Sean Yseult (formerly of White Zombie)

Z 

 Annette Zilinskas (The Bangles)

References

External links 
 "Female Bass Players Learn Bass Guitar Intuitively." (February 14, 2008)

Female bass guitarists

Bass guitarists